Sabacon is a genus of the harvestman family Sabaconidae with about forty species.

Species of this genus have usually thickened pedipalps with stiff, fine hairs, which is unique among harvestmen. Although the small eye tubercle is usually not ornamented, there is a spine on one Nepalese species. Males have long, thin legs, females are stouter.

The genus is widespread in the temperate northern hemisphere, even extending into the subarctic, with the most southern records from caves in the southeastern United States and high elevations in Nepal. The center of diversification seems to be in Asia, where many species were described from Japan, Korea and Nepal. Some species occur in Europe.

While the Asian and North American species are easy to differententiate from one another by male genital traits, the few European species are very similar, and seem to be closely related to S. cavicolens. S. mitchelli, which, like the larger S. cavicolens, occurs in the eastern US, is quite different from the latter, with males lacking cheliceral glands. Species from the western US seem most closely related to Asian forms. S. astoriensis is very similar to S. dentipalpe and S. makinoi; it was collected from dried seaweed and debris in beach dunes.

Almost all Sabacon species prefer moist, cool microhabitats, and many species live in caves, but none are modified for cave life. Outside of caves they are often found in forests or shaded ravines.

Species
 Sabacon akiyoshiense Suzuki, 1963
 Sabacon altomontanum Martens, 1983 (France)
 Sabacon astoriensis Shear, 1975 (Oregon)
 † Sabacon bachofeni Roewer, 1939 (fossil: Baltic amber)
 Sabacon briggsi Shear, 1975 (California)
 Sabacon bryantii (Banks, 1898) (southeastern coastal Alaska)
 Sabacon cavicolens (Packard, 1884) (eastern US)
 Sabacon chomolongmae Martens, 1972
 Sabacon crassipalpe (L. Koch, 1879) (Siberia, North America)
 Sabacon dentipalpe Suzuki, 1949 (Japan)
 Sabacon dhaulagiri Martens, 1972
 Sabacon distinctum Suzuki, 1974
 Sabacon franzi Roewer, 1953
 Sabacon gonggashan Tsurusaki & Song, 1993 (Sichuan)
 Sabacon imamurai Suzuki, 1964
 Sabacon iriei Suzuki, 1974
 Sabacon ishizuchi Suzuki, 1974
 Sabacon jiriensis Martens, 1972
 Sabacon jonesi Goodnight & Goodnight, 1942 (Alabama)
 Sabacon makinoi Suzuki, 1949 (Japan)
 Sabacon makinoi makinoi Suzuki, 1949
 Sabacon makinoi sugimotoi Suzuki & Tsurusaki, 1983
 Sabacon martensi Tsurusaki & Song, 1993 (Sichuan)
 Sabacon mitchelli Crosby & Bishop, 1924 (North Carolina)
 Sabacon okadai Suzuki, 1941
 Sabacon palpogranulatum Martens, 1972
 Sabacon paradoxum Simon, 1879 (Pyrenees)
 Sabacon pasonianum Glez-Luque, 1991 (cave in Spain)
 Sabacon pectiginosa Simon, 1913 (Spain)
 Sabacon picosantrum Martens, 1983 (Spain)
 Sabacon pygmaeum Miyosi, 1942 (Japan)
 Sabacon relictum Marten, 1972
 Sabacon robusta Simon, 1873 (Spain)
 Sabacon satoikioi Miyosi, 1942
 Sabacon sergeidedicatum Martens, 1989 (Siberia)
 Sabacon sheari Cokendolpher, 1984 (Oregon)
 Sabacon simoni Dresco, 1952
 Sabacon siskiyou Shear, 1975 (California, Oregon)
 Sabacon unicornis Martens, 1972
 Sabacon viscayanum Simon, 1881
 Sabacon viscayanum ramblaianum Martens, 1983 (France)
 Sabacon viscayanum viscayanum Simon, 1881

Footnotes

References
 's Biology Catalog: Sabaconidae
  (1975): The Opilionid Genera Sabacon and Tomicomerus in America (Opiliones, Troguloidea, Ischyropsalidae). Journal of Arachnology 3(1): 5-29. PDF (with description of S. cavicolens, S. mitchelli, S. occidentalis, S. siskiyou, S. astoriensis S. briggsi, S. bryantii)

Harvestmen
Arachnids of Asia
Cave arachnids